Henry Andrews may refer to:

Henry Andrews (mathematician) (1744–1820), British mathematician and astronomer
Henry Cranke Andrews (fl. 1794–1830), English botanist
Henry John Andrews (1871–1919), English recipient of the Victoria Cross
Henry Andrews (cricketer) (1821–1865), English cricketer
Henry Nathaniel Andrews (1910–2002), American paleobotanist

Fictional characters
Henry Andrews (CSI), television series fictional character

See also
Harry Andrews (1911–1989), English actor